Bill Alter (born May 15, 1944) is a former Missouri Republican politician serving in the Missouri State Senate.  He lives in High Ridge, Missouri, with his wife Merijo.

He was born in Iowa City, Iowa, in 1944.  After moving to Missouri, he graduated from the Parkway School District.  He then entered the United States Navy and attended their Electronics School from 1963 to 1965.  From 1982 through 1984 he attended the Jefferson College Law Enforcement Training Center.  He has since garnered twenty-two years of law enforcement experience.

He is a reserve police officer, the owner of a management business, and a vice president of a national company.  He is a member of the National Rifle Association and the former president of the High Ridge Rotary Club.

He was elected to the Missouri House of Representatives in 1989, and served in that body through 2000.  He was elected to the Missouri State Senate in a special election in 2005.

He served on the following committees:
Aging, Families, Mental and Public Health
Education
Judiciary and Civil and Criminal Jurisprudence
Small Business, Insurance, and Industrial Relations

References
Official Manual, State of Missouri, 2005-2006. Jefferson City, MO: Secretary of State.

Politicians from Iowa City, Iowa
1944 births
Living people
People from High Ridge, Missouri
Jefferson College (Missouri) alumni
Members of the Missouri House of Representatives
Missouri state senators